The people of Shandong province or Shandong people refers to those who are native to Shandong province, the majority (99%) of whom are Han Chinese identity. They speak various forms of Chinese such as Jilu, Jiaoliao, and Zhongyuan. There is a small Shandong community in Singapore and Malaysia. Nine-tenths of the early overseas Chinese in Korea also came from Shandong. Shandong citizens are also known to have the tallest average height of any Chinese province. As of 2010, 16- to 18-year-old male students in Yantai measured 176.4 cm (5'9.5), while female students measured 164 cm (5'4.5).

History
Modern-day Shandong is primarily located in the territories of Qi During the Warring States Period. It was the last Kingdom to be annexed by the Qin kingdom prior to the beginning of the Qin dynasty. After the brief 15-year unification by the Qin dynasty, the empire broke into Eighteen Kingdoms. Present day Shandong was split into two feudal states, Jiaodong (胶东) and Jibei (济北). The Han kingdom then headed by King Liu Bang united the kingdoms to form the Han dynasty. After 400 years, the Han dynasty fell and the empire scattered and after the disintegration of the Cao Wei dynasty, the area of present-day Shandong was ruled by the Tuoba Clan of the Xianbei Tribe during the Eastern Wei. The Eastern Wei eventually fell to the Northern Qi dynasty which lasted 27 years before it was overtaken by the Northern Zhou of central China. Emperor Wen of Sui was able to recapture ruling power to the Han Chinese from the Xianbei and establish the Sui dynasty after centuries of Xianbei rule and division between different states, becoming Emperor Wen of Sui. After unifying the Northern and Southern dynasties, the Sui dynasty paved the way for the Tang dynasty and many years of prosperity and peace. The Tang dynasty fell about 300 years after its inception. The empire again, fragmented, this time into many different states whose borders are roughly the outline of the present day provinces. During this time Shandong was known as the Later Liang (Five Dynasties) Kingdom.

There were considerable foreign settlements by the British, Germans, Americans, and Russians in Shandong cities during the 18th century. For 20 years prior to the end of World War I, the Germans controlled Shandong. After the defeat of Germany in WWI by the Allied forces, the cities of Chefoo and Tsingtao were handed to the Japanese who used the port cities for their summer fleets. This led to the Shandong Problem which added to the ignition of the May Fourth Movement and the New Culture Movement— paving the way for the birth of modern China.

Chinese-Korean clans from Shandong

Chungju Ji clan
Chungju Mae clan
Ganghwa Noh clan
Geumseong Beom clan
Haengju Ki clan
Haman Jo clan
Langya Jeong clan
Jinan Wang clan
Imgu Pung clan 
Namyang Bang clan
Namyang Hong clan
Namyang Seo clan
Qufu Kong clan – descendant of 53rd grandchild of Confucius, Kong Shao
Sinchang Maeng clan – descendant of 39th grandchild of Mencius, Meng Cheng Shun
Yeoheung Min clan
Yeongyang Cheon clan
Yangsan Jin clan

Cuisine
Shandong cuisine is one of the "8 Great Regional Cuisines" of China. It is noted for uses of seafood, vinegar, and garlic.

Since Shandong is located in fertile plains, it is a main wheat-growing area in China. People in Shandong enjoy eating foods made of wheat flour as staple food. It is commonly said that Shandong people like to eat big pan-cakes stuffed with scallions or minced meat when they eat three meals a day.

Shandong cuisine is generally salty, with a prevalence of light-colored sauces, and features adept skill in slicing. Shandong cuisine is representative of Northern Chinese cooking and its techniques have been widely absorbed by the imperial dishes.

Notable dishes
 Dezhou Braised (Grilled) Chicken (simplified Chinese: 德州扒鸡 Dézhōu pá jī) also known as "Dezhou Five-fragrant Boneless Braised Chicken" from the city of Dezhou.
 Clay Pot Braised Pork Belly (simplified Chinese: 坛子肉 tánzi ròu) the original Red braised pork belly which has now spread all over China, and is more popularly known as Chairman Mao's favorite dish. Different provinces have different variations of this dish. Tanzi Rou, literally means brewed pork in jar, as the dish is cooked in a porcelain or clay pot. It is said that the dish originated in the Jinan Fengjilou Hotel.
 Eight Immortal Soup a seafood soup popular in overseas Chinese communities. 
 Fluffy Scallion Pan-Cake (simplified Chinese: 山东大饼) is a version of a scallion pancake that is much more dense, fluffier, and thicker than the more widespread southern style, Green-Scallion Oil Pancake. This type of bread can come either plain topped with sesame seeds, or stuffed with meat filling or glass-noodle or eggs and Chinese chives. Different variations exist. 
 Shandong Fried Oyster
 Braised Sea Cucumber with Scallion
 Pulled-Caramelized Sweet Potato (simplified Chinese: 拔丝地瓜 básī dìguā)
 Shandong Dumplings Shandong style dumplings are notably plumper and traditionally made with Pork & Cabbage or Mackerel & Leek (Jiaodong style). They are noted for their Gold-nugget like appearance that is accomplished via a particular squeezing technique instead of the more common folding technique.

Culture
Evidence of the Beixin culture (5300 BC to 4100 BC), the Dawenkou culture (4100 BC to 2600 BC) and the Longshan Culture (3000 BC to 2000 BC) was found in Shandong province, which provides evidence that comparatively advanced handcraft industry, agriculture and animal husbandry was prevalent in Shandong 4000 to 7000 years ago. Additionally, Shandong is home to some of the oldest Chinese inscriptions: Dawenkou Pottery Inscription and Longshan Pottery Inscription; the largest prehistoric settlement found to date: Chengziya Archeological Site; the oldest section of the Great Wall in China: the Great Wall of Qi State; Huantai County oracle bone script, among the oldest found in China, were all found in Shandong. According to the research of archaeologists, Shandong was the main hub for silk manufacture from the Han dynasty to the Tang dynasty, and it was the start of the ancient Silk Road.

Heritage sites

Notable people

Political leaders
 President Roh Tae-woo: President of Korea
 Chief Leung Chun-ying: Chief Executive of Hong Kong

Academia
 Liu Hui – ancient Chinese mathematician
 Jiao Bingzhen – a noted astronomer and artist
 Ke Ting Sui 葛庭燧 – known for the Kê pendulum and Kê grain-boundary internal friction peak he invented
 Li Zhensheng – geneticist of wheat
 Guo Yonghuai – Chinese expert in aerodynamics
 Samuel C. C. Ting 丁肇中 – Nobel Prize in Physics laureate
 Zhan Tao – Chinese mathematician and president of Jilin University.
 Qu Qinyue – astrophysicist and president of Nanjing University.

Philosophers
Confucius – considered to be the greatest Chinese philosopher, founder of Confucianism and contributed greatly to Chinese culture
Mozi – founder of Mohism
Disciples of Confucius – helped to compile much of the teachings of the greatest Chinese philosopher and their teacher, Confucius, in the Analects of Confucius
Mencius – the most famous Confucian after Confucius himself, responsible for propagating Confucianism
Zengzi – one of the Four Sages or Confucianism, composed Classic of Filial Piety
Zou Yan – best known as the representative thinker of the Yin and Yang School (or School of Naturalists) during the Hundred Schools of Thought era in Chinese philosophy.
Duanmu Ci
Zheng Xuan
Linji Yixuan
Mou Zongsan

Literati
Alfred James Broomhall – author and historian
Deng Guangming – 20th century historian
Han Xizai – official of states Wu (Ten Kingdoms) and Southern Tang, famed for his writing and calligraphy skills.
Li Baojia – Qing dynasty author
Li Cunxin – author of Mao's Last Dancer
Mo Yan – Nobel Prize in Literature laureate
Nicholas Poppe – linguist
Peter Stursberg – Canadian writer, broadcaster, and war correspondent 
Pu Songling – Qing dynasty writer, author of Strange Stories from a Chinese Studio
Qu Bo – 20th century author
Yan Chongnian – historian
Yan Zhen – calligrapher
Zuo Fen – female poet during the Western Jin dynasty

Entertainers 
Gong Li – actress
Fan Bing Bing – actress
Zhang Yuqi – actress
Wang Yan – actress
Hachidai Nakamura – jazz pianist and songwriter
Huang Xiaoming – actor
Huang Bo – actor
Huang Zitao – actor, singer, former Exo (band) member and idol
Victoria Song – actress, F(x) (band) leader
Toshiro Mifune – actor
Jin Chen – actress
Gina Jin – actress
Ren Jia Lun – actor
Bai Baihe – actress
Chen Hao – actress
Ma Tianyu – actor
Zhang Zilin – Miss World 2007
Teresa Teng – pop Icon
Dee Hsu – TV host in Taiwan
Show Luo – Taiwanese entertainer (father)
Eddie Huang – Taiwanese American lawyer, author, and restaurateur (mother)
Fei Fei Sun – super model, face of Estee Lauder, first model of Asian descent to represent Valentino and grace the cover of Vogue Italy
Kara Hui – Hong Kong actress of Manchu ethnicity
Wei Zheming (Miles Wei) – actor, singer, model

Athletes
Gao Yisheng – 20th century martial arts master, founder of Gao Style Baguazhang
Sun Wengjin – Chinese women's volleyball player
Xu Jing – Chinese women's Olympic archer
Yan Bingtao – youngest player to win Amateur World Snooker Championship, professional pool player
Zhang Chenglong – 2012 Olympic gold medal gymnast
Zhang Qibin – swimmer in 2016 Olympics
Zhang Zhiqiang – Chinese rugby player, former Leicester Tigers member

Statesmen
Liu Yao – governor and warlod during the Eastern Han dynasty
Empress Dowager Bian – wife of Cao Cao famed Three Kingdoms Warlord, mother of Cao Pi who ended the Eastern Han dynasty began the Wei dynasty.
Lord Mengchang – aristocrat and statesman of the Qi Kingdom, one of the famed Four Lords of the Warring States period.
Empress Lü – infamous wife of the first emperor of Han dynasty
Peng Liyuan – contemporary folk singer, president of the People's Liberation Army Academy of Art, and First Lady of China
Qi Jiguang – military general of the Ming dynasty, author of military manuals Jixiao Xinshu and Record of Military Training
Queen Dowager Shi 
Qu Tongfeng – general in the Beiyang Army during the Warlord era under Yuan Shikai
Zhuge Liang – imperial chancellor, inventor and engineer, legalist (Chinese Philosophy), accomplished strategist in Chinese history during the Three Kingdoms period
Wan Li – 5th Chairman of the Standing Committee of the National People's Congress. A Chinese Communist revolutionary and one of the leading moderate reformers in China's top leadership in the 1980s. In office 13 April 1988 – 27 March 1993.

Businesspeople
Chen Xiaolu – early director of Anbang insurance giant
 Dr. Chiang Chen – entrepreneur and Hong Kong industrialist, founder of Chen Hsong Holdings Limited
Guo Wengui – Chinese billionaire
Kai Johan Jiang – Swedish-Chinese businessman in energy
Karl Juchheim – German confectioner, founder of Juchheim Company 
Henry Luce – 20th century American magazine magnate
Ning Gaoning – chairman of Sinochem Group
Ren Zhiqiang – real estate tycoon
Xiao Jianhua – Chinese-Canadian billionaire
Xu Lejiang – billionaire
Wang Tianpu – former Sinopec president
Zhang Shiping – billionaire
Zhang Ruimin – CEO of Haier Group

References

Bibliography

Ethnic groups in China